James Curran may refer to:

 James W. Curran, epidemiologist and leader of the CDC's AIDS task force during the early AIDS crisis
 James Curran (linguist), senior lecturer at the University of Sydney
 Jim Curran (1927–2005), Australian politician
 James T. Curran (1932–2015), founder of the Little Brothers of St. Francis in the Archdiocese of Boston
 James Curran (murder victim) (c. 1962–2005), victim of a politically charged murder conspiracy in Ireland
 James Michael Curran (1903–1968), American civil engineer
 James Watson Curran (1865–1920), newspaper publisher and editor